Cecil Leon Johnson (February 9, 1893 – March 3, 1977) was an American Negro league infielder in the 1910s and 1920s.

A native of Wilmington, Delaware, Johnson made his Negro leagues debut in 1918 with the Bacharach Giants and the Hilldale Club. He went on to play for the Philadelphia Royal Stars and the Philadelphia Tigers. Johnson died in Philadelphia, Pennsylvania in 1977 at age 84.

References

External links
 and Seamheads

1893 births
1977 deaths
Bacharach Giants players
Hilldale Club players
Philadelphia Tigers players
Baseball infielders
Baseball players from Wilmington, Delaware